A Boy Called Po (also known as Po) is a 2016 American drama film directed by John Asher and written by Colin Goldman, based on a true story starring Christopher Gorham, Julian Feder, and Kaitlin Doubleday. When his wife dies of cancer, an overworked engineer struggles to care for his son with autism. In response to bullying, the young boy regresses into a fantasy world escape. The score for the film was composed by Burt Bacharach.

Cast 
Christopher Gorham as David Wilson
Julian Feder as Po
Kaitlin Doubleday as Amy
Andrew Bowen as Jack
Sean Gunn as Ben
Caitlin Carmichael as Amelia Carr
Bryan Batt as Randall Bane
Fay Masterson as Valerie
Brian George as Bill
Tristan Chase as Taylor Martz

Reception 
RogerEbert.com states: "The intentions behind "A Boy Called Po" are not only good, but honorable." Film Daily less favorably states, "A Boy Called Po might have the best of intentions, and Asher clearly meant well with it, but that doesn’t cure its cloying and saccharine tone, falling prey as it does to the same old autism fiction tropes." Dove.org considers: "Po is an inspiring story about a committed father, David Wilson (Christopher Gorham), and his love and concern for his autistic son, Patrick, fondly called “Po”." Movieguide.org states: "A Boy Called Po is an engaging, low budget movie with a strong, powerful climax. There are a few endings after the climax, but they each resolve several important issues. The heart of this movie is the relationship between the father and his son."

Awards 
In 2016, the film won the Gold Remi Award at Worldfest Houston, the Festival Award for Breakthrough Feature at the San Diego International Film Festival, Best Feature at the Palm Beach International Film Festival, Outstanding Achievement in Filmmaking, Music, at the Newport Beach Film Festival, Best Actor (Julian Feder) at the Albuquerque Film & Music Experience, Best Actor (Julian Feder) at the Young Artists Awards as well as being nominated for many other accolades.

References

External links

2016 films
2010s American films
2010s English-language films
American drama films
Films about autism
Films about father–son relationships
Films scored by Burt Bacharach